Anoplotrupes stercorosus, the dor beetle, is a species of earth-boring dung beetle belonging to the family Geotrupidae, subfamily Geotrupinae.

Varieties
Varieties or forms that have been recognized at times include the following:
A. stercorosus var. viridis (Dalla Torre, 1879)
A. stercorosus var. amoethystinus (Mulsant, 1842)
A. stercorosus var. nigrinus (Mulsant, 1842)
A. stercorosus ab. juvenilis (Mulsant, 1842)

These are now regarded as synonyms of the parent taxon; the International Code of Zoological Nomenclature does not recognize named forms other than subspecies.

Distribution
This beetle is present throughout Europe (Albania, Andorra, Austria, Belarus, Belgium, Bosnia and Herzegovina, Bulgaria, Corsica, Croatia, Czech Republic, Denmark, Estonia, Finland, France, Germany, Greece, Hungary, Ireland, Italy, Latvia, Lithuania, Liechtenstein, Luxembourg, Montenegro, Netherlands, Norway, Poland, Portugal, Romania, Russia, Serbia, Slovakia, Slovenia, Spain, Sweden, Switzerland, Turkey, Ukraine, United Kingdom) It is also found in other regions of the world where cattle have been introduced, such as Australia..

Habitat
These beetles inhabit fresh areas of broadleaf forests, mainly beech forests; moist mixed forest; and fresh coniferous forests.

Description
The body colour is blue-black, while the underside is usually metallic blue. The elytra have seven longitudinal slightly dotted grooves. The wings may be blue, violet or green. Antennae are reddish brown. Geotrupes stercorarius presents three keels on the outer side of the tibia of the third pair of legs, while A. stercorosus presents only two.

Biology
Adults can be encountered from June through the following spring. These dung beetles feed on feces, rotting fungi and tree sap. They may also feed on litter mold, decomposing fungi and Phallus impudicus. The larvae overwinter and pupate in spring, requiring a year to complete the whole process.

Gallery

Bibliography
 Anderson, R., Nash, R. & O'Connor, J. P. 1997, Irish Coleoptera: a revised and annotated list, Irish Naturalists' Journal Special Entomological Supplement, 1-81
 Joy, N. H., 1932, A practical handbook of British beetles, H. F. & G. Witherby, London
 Jessop, L., 1986, Coleoptera: Scarabaeoidea. Dung beetles and chafers
 Mann, D., 2002, Geotrupidae in: Checklist of Beetles of the British Isles. www.coleopterist.org.uk
 Mulsant E. (1842) Histoire naturelle des Coléoptères de France. Lamellicornes, Paris, Lyon :1-623
 Scriba L.G. (1791) Entomologische Bemerkungen und Erfahrungen, Journal für die Liebhaber der Entomologie. Frankfurt 1(3):244-255

References

External links
 Habitas
 Animal Diversity
 Aramel.free

Geotrupidae
Beetles of Europe
Beetles described in 1791
Articles containing video clips